Ticketron was a computerized event ticketing company that was in operation from the 1960s until 1990. It was the industry leader until overtaken by Ticketmaster. In 1990, the majority of Ticketron's assets and business were sold and the following year they were sold on to rival Ticketmaster.

History
The original Ticketron was based in Fort Lee, New Jersey and its president was Clayton B Hulsh. Ticketron unsuccessfully trialled its computerized ticketing system in summer 1967 and folded later that year. The name was bought by a rival, Ticket Reservations Systems, Inc (TRS) and became the name of the service run by TRS in July 1969.

Ticket Reservations Systems, Inc had been incorporated on May 4, 1965 and was based in New York. It was funded by Cemp Investments headed by Edgar Bronfman Sr. It hired Jack Quinn who became president and the company started selling tickets in May 1967 from six Alexander's stores in New York and New Jersey using a duplexed Control Data Corporation 1700 computer system with terminal equipment supplied by Computer Applications, Inc. that it called "electronic box offices". TRS initially charged 25 cents to the customer and 25 cents to the event but returned 12.5 cents to the house. It moved to a 10% charge in 1970. The terminals expanded to other publicly accessible locations, such as banks and department stores.

The original software resided on a pair (one for backup) of CDC 1700 computers located on the first floor of the Beverly Hilton Hotel with a large window facing Wilshire  Blvd. The system had back-up power generators in the basement to help ensure un-interruptible service. The system was designed to ensure that a given 'seat' at an event could not be sold more than once.

In 1969, 51% of TRS was sold to Control Data for $3.9 million with Edgar Bronfman Sr. and his family retaining 25%. Former ABC television president, Thomas W. Moore became chairman of TRS.

Another competitor, Computicket, owned by Computer Sciences Corporation, folded in April 1970 leaving Ticketron as the sole computerized ticketing provider in the US. In 1973, Control Data bought out Cemp Investments. In 1979, Ticketron starting selling tickets by phone.

In addition to the better-known event ticketing system, Ticketron also provided ticketing terminals and back-end infrastructure for parimutuel betting, and provided similar services for a number of US lotteries, including those in New York, Illinois, Pennsylvania, Delaware, Washington and Maryland.

By the mid 1980s, Ticketron had 600 outlets in 22 US states and Canada. By 1990, Ticketron had 750 outlets and had a 40% market share, behind Ticketmaster with 50% of the market. In 1990 the majority of Ticketron's assets and business, with the exception of a small antitrust carve-out for Broadway's "Telecharge" business-unit, were bought by The Carlyle Group who sold it the following year to rival Ticketmaster, which had been founded in 1976.

The Ticketron name was revived in 2017 after Ticketmaster sold the brand name in 2017.

References

1967 establishments in New York (state)
1991 disestablishments in New York (state)
American companies established in 1967
American companies disestablished in 1991
Computer companies established in 1967
Computer companies disestablished in 1991
Control Data Corporation
Defunct computer companies of the United States
Defunct technology companies of the United States
Ticket sales companies